Darreh Kabud (also Romanized as Darreh Kabūd; also known as Darreh Kabūd ‘Olyā and Darreh Ḩoseynī) is a village in Shirvan Rural District, in the Central District of Borujerd County, Lorestan Province, Iran. At the 2006 census, its population was 184, in 39 families.

References 

Towns and villages in Borujerd County